MS1 may refer to:
 FMA Ae. M.S.1, an air ambulance version of the 1932 Argentine FMA AeC.2 utility aircraft
 first device in tandem mass spectrometry

MS-1 may refer to:
 Mercury-Scout 1, a 1961 satellite
 Mississippi's 1st congressional district
 Mississippi Highway 1
 Roland MS-1 Digital Sampler
 T-18 tank
 A type of Trams of Putilov plant
 MegaSquirt 'n Spark-Extra (MS1/Extra), a type of MegaSquirt electronic fuel injection controller
 MS-1 (wrestler), Mexican professional wrestler
 Metres per second, the SI unit of velocity, written as ms−1
 A first year medical student
 A proposed US Spaceplane was to use the designator MS-1